Lajedo may refer to the following places:

Lajedo, Cape Verde, Santo Antão, Cape Verde
Lajedo, Pernambuco, Brazil
Lajedo do Tabocal, Bahia, Brazil
Lajedo (Lajes das Flores), a civil parish in the municipality of Lajes das Flores, Azores, Portugal